The following is a complete episode list for the criminal dramedy television series Monk. It premiered on the USA Network on July 12, 2002 in the United States and ended with a two-part series finale on November 27 and December 4, 2009. The complete series has a total of 125 episodes, including three 2-part episodes and four Christmas specials.

Series overview

Episodes

Season 1 (2002)

Season 2 (2003–04)

Season 3 (2004–05)

Season 4 (2005–06)

Season 5 (2006–07)

Season 6 (2007–08)

Season 7 (2008–09)

Season 8 (2009)

Webisodes
These four webisodes were also released on the Season 5 DVD.

 Mr. Monk and Dr. Kroger
 Mr. Monk and the Computer
 Mr. Monk and the Blood Test
 Mr. Monk Goes to the Gym

Little Monk
USA Network ordered ten episodes that would deal with the Monk brothers' childhood. The first premiered on August 21, 2009. The series starred Aaron Linker as Little Monk, Chris Lizardi as Little Ambrose and Bella Thorne as Wendy, one of the Monks' classmates. The series was directed by Randall Zisk, with Hy Conrad, Andy Breckman, Kevin Albright, and Justin Brenneman serving as writers. Aaron Linker also appeared in the parent show as Little Monk in a flashback. The episodes are available only on the "Best of Monk" DVD.

Ratings

References

External links
 

 
Monk
Monk
E
!-- S07E05 -->| 4.65